Merlí: Sapere Aude is a Spanish teen drama streaming television series created by Héctor Lozano that premiered on 5 December 2019 via streaming on Movistar+. The series is a sequel and spin-off of the Merlí series broadcast by Catalan channel TV3, and revolves around Pol Rubio (Carlos Cuevas), who enters university to follow in the footsteps of his idolized professor at high school, Merlí. The series was shot in Catalan and Spanish. The second and final season, consisting of 8 episodes, was filmed between August and November 2020, and premiered on 2 April 2021 on Movistar+. The series is also streamable on Netflix.

Cast 
Returning cast members from the previous series include: Carlos Cuevas as Pol Rubio, David Solans as Bruno, Ana María Barbany as Carmina Calduch, Boris Ruiz as Alfonso, Assun Planas as Glòria, and Francesc Orella as Merlí. The new characters that enter the series are, among others: Pablo Capuz as Rai, Pol's classmate, Azul Fernández as Minerva, María Pujalte as María Bolaño, and Gloria Ramos.

Principal 
 Carlos Cuevas as Pol Rubio
 María Pujalte as María Bolaño
 David Solans as Bruno Bergeron (season 1)
 Pablo Capuz as Rai
 Claudia Vega as Oti
 Pere Vallribera as Biel Roca
 Boris Ruiz as Alfonso Rubio
 Azul Fernández as Minerva Picotti (season 1)
 Eusebio Poncela as Dino (season 2)
 Jordi Coll as Axel (season 2)

Recurring 
 Martí Atance as Arnau
 Fina Ríos
 Carlos Índriago as Ángel
 David Marcé
 Zoe Stein as Sara
 Arnaud Prechac as Etienne
 Lesley Grant as Amy O'Connor
 Roberto Garcia as Henry
 Teresa Sánchez as Susana
 Silvia Marsó as Esther
 Pere Brasó as Octavio
 Blanca Martínez as Judith
 Carme Conesa as Vicky
 Assun Planas as Glòria
 Gloria Ramos as Laura
 Eva Martín as Sílvia Montoliu

Guests 
 Francesc Orella as Merlí Bergeron (season 1)
 Ana María Barbany as Carmina Calduch (season 1)
 Marina Campos as a customer of the car park
 Mariano Nguema as Abdul
 Joan Negrié as Xavier Vidal
 Carles Bigorra as Jordi
 Jorge Burdman
 Jordi Pérez
 Jordi Figueras
 John G

Episodes

Season 1 (2019)

Season 2 (2021)

Notes

References

External links 
 

2010s Spanish drama television series
2019 Spanish television series debuts
Television shows set in Barcelona
2010s LGBT-related drama television series
Spanish LGBT-related television shows
Movistar+ network series
Spanish-language television shows
Spanish teen drama television series
2021 Spanish television series endings
Catalan-language television shows